Dr. Shobha Abhyankar (1946–2014) was an Indian musicologist and teacher of the Mewati Gharana. She is known for having taught many Hindustani Classical vocalists, like her son, Sanjeev Abhyankar

Biography
Shobha Abhyankar was born in 1946 in Pune, India. She married Vijay Abhyankar with whom she had two sons.

She earned her M.Sc. in Biochemistry from Pune University. She completed an M.A. in Music from SNDT Women's University, where she placed first. She also completed a Ph.D. in Music on the topic of Marathi bhavgeet.

She trained in music for decades with Pt. Gangadharbuwa Pimpalkhare, Pt. V. R. Athavale, and Pt. Jasraj. Consequently, she is regarded as a member of the Mewati Gharana with background in Gwalior gayaki and Agra gayaki.

Abhyankar had been affiliated with Lalit Kala Kendra, Pune University, and SNDT Women's University as a music scholar and guru.

Abhyankar has taught many students across Maharashtra who have earned international and national awards and scholarships. Her most notable disciples include Sanjeev Abhyankar (her son) and Sandeep Ranade.

Abhyankar died on October 17, 2014, after suffering from cancer.

Awards and recognition
 "Ganahira" Award
 Vasant Desai Award
 Pt. N. D. Kashalkar Award
 Pt. V. D. Paluskar Award
 "Raag Rishi" Award for Outstanding Work as a Guru

References

1946 births
2014 deaths
Hindustani singers
Mewati gharana
Singers from Pune
Marathi people
Marathi-language singers
Bhajan singers
20th-century Indian women singers
20th-century Indian singers
21st-century Indian women singers
21st-century Indian singers